Carabayllois one of the 43 districts of the province Lima in Peru. It is located in the Cono Norte area of the province and was created district by General José de San Martín in August 4, 1821 at which time it was the only district to occupy the area north of the Rímac River up to the province Canta.

Boundaries 
It borders to the north and east with the Canta Province in the Lima Region, the south with the Comas district, the San Juan de Lurigancho district and San Antonio de Chaclla district, and to the west with the Puente Piedra and Ancón districts.

History 
Carabayllo was the first district to be created by decree in the Lima Province by General José de San Martín in the independence era on August 4, 1821. At that time the district occupied the whole Chillón valley north of the Rímac River up to the Canta province. In principle, the district was the only one in the north, and included the districts of: Ancón, Santa Rosa, Puente Piedra, Ventanilla, Comas, San Martín de Porres, Independencia, Los Olivos, Santa Rosa de Quives and part of Rímac District. Through the years the district lost most of its territory to newly created districts following the growth of economic activity and the growth of the population in the area. This process started as early as 1874 when the Ancón District was created and continued to as recent as 1961 when the Comas District was created and as recent as 1969 when the Ventanilla District was founded in neighboring Callao Province. Carabayllo still remains the largest district in Lima with an area of 346 km2 and a population of about 200,000 (2005).
Carabayllo is a zone of recent expansion to the city. The principal road connecting the district to the rest of the metropolis is the Tupac Amaru Avenue. It is at an altitude of 238 meters above sea level. Its social economic level is principally made up of middle and lower middle classes.

See also 
Lima
Lima Metropolitan Area
List of districts of Lima
Cono Norte
Districts of Peru
 Administrative divisions of Peru

References

External links
  Official web site
  Portal of Carabayllo District

Districts of Lima